The Pennsylvania Department of Revenue (DOR) is an agency of the U.S. state of Pennsylvania. The department is responsible for collecting all Pennsylvania taxes, including all corporate taxes and taxes on inheritance, personal income, sales and use, realty transfer, motor fuel, and all other state taxes. The DOR was created in 1927 and began operating in 1929.

Organizational structure 
The DOR is composed of the following sub-units:
Deputy Secretary of Revenue 
 Deputy Secretary for Taxation
 Taxpayer Service and Information Center
 Bureau of Corporation Taxes
 Bureau of Individual Taxes
 Bureau of Business Trust Fund Taxes
 Bureau of Motor Fuel Taxes
 Business Operations Office
 Deputy Secretary for Tax Policy
 Board of Appeals
 Bureau of Audits
 Bureau of Research
 Deputy Secretary for Administration
 Bureau of Administrative Services
 Equal Opportunity Office
 Bureau of Human Resources
 Bureau of Fiscal Management
 Bureau of Imaging and Document Management
 Deputy Secretary for Compliance and Collections
 Bureau of Collections and Taxpayer Services
 Bureau of Compliance
 Office of Criminal Tax Investigations
 Pass Through Business Office
 Bureau of Enforcement Planning, Analysis, and Discovery
 Deputy Secretary for Information Technology
 Office of e-Commerce
 Bureau of Information Systems
 Office of Chief Counsel
 Press Office
 Pennsylvania Lottery
 Office of Legislative Affairs
 Policy Office and the Office of Taxpayers’ Rights Advocate

List of secretaries

See also 
 List of Pennsylvania state agencies

Notes

References

External links 
 Pennsylvania Department of Revenue

Revenue
Taxation in Pennsylvania
Government agencies established in 1927
1927 establishments in Pennsylvania
US state tax agencies